The Sydney Harbour Control Tower oversaw vessel movements on Sydney Harbour, Australia from 1974 until 2011. It was demolished in 2016.

History
The Sydney Harbour Control Tower was opened in 1974 by the Maritime Services Board as part of the redevelopment of Darling Harbour as a container port. The site was selected as it had views of all of the main shipping channels of Sydney Harbour. The 87 metre tower was built overlooking Walsh Bay and Darling Harbour. It had a cylindrical reinforced concrete column with a circular stainless steel and glass cabin with three floors.

With the transfer of container shipping operations to Port Botany, the tower closed in 2011, with ownership transferred from Roads & Maritime Services to the Barangaroo Delivery Authority in 2012. It was demolished in 2016 as part of the Barangaroo redevelopment.

References

External links

Buildings and structures demolished in 2016
Millers Point, New South Wales
Sydney Harbour
Towers completed in 1974
Towers in Australia
1974 establishments in Australia
2016 disestablishments in Australia